Medicine Creek may refer to:

Medicine Creek (Missouri), a stream in Missouri
Medicine Creek (Republican River), a stream in Nebraska
Medicine Creek (McAllister Creek tributary), a stream in Washington